The Valparaiso Beacons baseball team is a baseball team that represents Valparaiso University in Valparaiso, Indiana. The Beacons competed in the NCAA Division I Baseball Championship five times before 1970. After returning in 2012 for the first time in 44 years, the Beacons' first round game was almost delayed an additional day, because the preceding game was the second-longest in NCAA tournament history. The Beacons game against the Purdue Boilermakers began at approximately 10:40 pm only 20 minutes before a curfew. In their second game of the NCAA tournament, the Crusaders played the Kentucky Wildcats, who lost the marathon game to the Kent State Golden Flashes. The games were played at U.S. Steel Yard in Gary, Indiana.

The 2012 Beacons team tied a school record with 35 wins.

The Beacons are coached by Brian Schmack. They play their home games at Emory G. Bauer Field.

Musketeers in the Major Leagues

Taken from Baseball Reference. Updated June 28, 2021.

See also
List of NCAA Division I baseball programs

References

 
1916 establishments in Indiana
baseball teams established in 1916